The United Federation of Workers in Denmark (3F) is a Danish labor union.

The union was formed in 2004, from the merger of the Danish Women Workers' Union and the Danish General Workers' Union.  In 2006, the Restaurant Trade Union merged in to 3F, while, at the start of 2011, it was joined by the Danish Timber Industry and Construction Workers' Union.

The 3F was an affiliate of the Danish Confederation of Trade Unions, and since 2019 has been a member of its successor, the Danish Trade Union Confederation (FH).  By the end of 2018, its membership had declined to 226,271, but it remained the largest affiliate of FH.

Presidents
2005: Poul Christensen
2013: Per Christensen

References

External links

Danish Confederation of Trade Unions
General unions
Trade unions in Denmark
Trade unions established in 2004
2004 establishments in Denmark